is a former Japanese football player and manager.

Club career
Imai was born in Shizuoka on April 2, 1959. After graduating from Kokushikan University, he joined Honda in 1982. He played 115 games in Japan Soccer League. He retired in 1990.

Futsal career
In 1989, Imai was elected to the Japan national futsal team for the 1989 Futsal World Championship in Netherlands.

Coaching career
In 1989, Imai became a playing manager at Honda. In 2001, he became a manager for Philippines national team. In 2002, he returned to Japan and signed with Avispa Fukuoka. In 2003, he became a manager for Macau national team and he managed until 2004. In 2007, he signed with Tokushima Vortis.

Managerial statistics

References

External links
Masataka Imai at FIFA.com

Tokushima Vortis
Avispa names Imai as new boss

1959 births
Living people
Futsal goalkeepers
Kokushikan University alumni
Association football people from Shizuoka Prefecture
Japanese footballers
Japanese men's futsal players
Japan Soccer League players
Honda FC players
Japanese football managers
J2 League managers
J3 League managers
Expatriate football managers in the Philippines
Philippines national football team managers
Avispa Fukuoka managers
Expatriate football managers in Macau
Macau national football team managers
Tokushima Vortis managers
Azul Claro Numazu managers
Association football goalkeepers
Japanese expatriate sportspeople in Macau
Japanese expatriate sportspeople in the Philippines